The following is a list of works by Banksy. Banksy, active since the 1990s, is an English-based graffiti artist, political activist and film director whose real identity is unknown. His satirical street art and subversive epigrams combine dark humour with graffiti executed in a distinctive stenciling technique. His works of political and social commentary have been featured on streets, walls, and bridges of cities throughout the world.

Works by Banksy

 A Great British Spraycation
 Aachoo!!
 The Antics Roadshow
 Art Buff
 Ballerina with Action Man Parts
 Balloon Girl
 The Banality of the Banality of Evil
 Banksus Militus Ratus
 Better Out Than In
 Bomb Hugger
 Bombing Middle England
 Cardinal Sin
 Civilian Drone Strike
 Corrupted Oil - Jerry
 Devolved Parliament – sold for £9,879,500 in 2019
 Dismaland 
 Dream Boat
 The Drinker
 Exit Through the Gift Shop
 Flower Thrower
 Flying Copper
 Follow Your Dreams
 Forgive Us Our Trespassing
 Fragile Silence
 Game Changer
 Glory – sold for £72,000 in 2007
 Gorilla in a Pink Mask
 Guard with balloon dog (Banksy)
 Hula Hooping Girl
 If You Don't Mask, You Don't Get
 Kissing Coppers
 Leake Street
 Love is in the Bin
 Mediterranean Sea View 2017 (sold for £2.2 million in 2020)
 The Mild Mild West
 Mobile Lovers
 MoneyBart
 One Nation Under CCTV
 Painting for Saints (2020)
 Parachuting Rat
 Peace dove
 Pulp Fiction 
 Reindeers
 Scar of Bethlehem
 Season's Greetings
 Self Portrait
 Shop Till You Drop
 Show Me the Monet
 Simple Intelligence Testing in Dumb Animals
 Slave Labour
 Soldier perquisition
 Space Girl and Bird
 Spy Booth
 The Son of a Migrant from Syria
 The Village Pet Store and Charcoal Grill
 The Walled Off Hotel
 Think Tank (cover art)
 Thug of Life Police Man
 Untitled (2004)
 Valentine's day mascara
 Valentine's Banksy
 Well Hung Lover

References

Banksy